is a small asteroid that is a Near-Earth object and an Apollo asteroid.

Orbit
The orbit of  makes it a potentially hazardous asteroid (PHA) that is predicted to pass within  of the Earth on Oct 14, 2023. For comparison, the distance to the Moon is about 0.0026 AU (384,400 km). The asteroid passed within  from Earth around October 15, 1977.

The Jupiter Tisserand invariant, used to distinguish different kinds of orbits, is 3.821.

See also
 99942 Apophis

References

External links 
 
 
 

Minor planet object articles (unnumbered)
Earth-crossing asteroids

20110401